Lieutenant Colonel Wilfrith Elstob  (8 September 1888 – 21 March 1918) was an English recipient of the Victoria Cross, the highest and most prestigious award for gallantry in the face of the enemy that can be awarded to British and Commonwealth forces.

Background
Elstob was born in Chichester in 1888, the son of the Rev. Canon J. G. Elstob and Frances Alice Elstob. His elder brother, Eric, would serve in the Royal Navy and play first-class cricket. He was educated at Christ's Hospital. Until war broke out and he volunteered, he was a schoolteacher. When Elstob was 29 years old, and a temporary lieutenant colonel commanding the 16th (Service) Battalion, Manchester Regiment, British Army during the First World War, he was awarded the VC for his actions on 21 March 1918 at the Manchester Redoubt, near Saint-Quentin, France on the first day of the German spring offensive. He was killed in action that same day.

Citation

The medal
His Victoria Cross is displayed at the Museum of the Manchester Regiment, at Ashton Town Hall, Ashton-under-Lyne, England.

Commemoration
Elstob has no known grave. He is commemorated on the Pozières Memorial, in the Somme department of France, to the missing of the Fifth Army; and on the war memorial in Macclesfield, Cheshire.  There is a memorial to him in All Saints Church, Siddington, where his father was vicar.

References

Further reading
Monuments to Courage (David Harvey, 1999)
The Register of the Victoria Cross (This England, 1997)
VCs of the First World War - Spring Offensive 1918 (Gerald Gliddon, 1997)
Wilfrith Elstob, VC, DSO, MC: Manchester Regiment – "Here We Fight, Here We Die" (Robert Bonner, 1998)

1918 deaths
Manchester Regiment officers
Companions of the Distinguished Service Order
Recipients of the Military Cross
British Army personnel of World War I
British World War I recipients of the Victoria Cross
British military personnel killed in World War I
People from Chichester
People educated at Christ's Hospital
1888 births
British Army recipients of the Victoria Cross
Military personnel from Sussex